Dev (born Swaminath Raamanathan) is an Indian actor and content producer, who appears in Tamil films. He was earlier credited as Abhinav until 2019, when he adopted his new name.

Career 
He made his debut playing Nazriya Nazim's love interest in director Balaji Mohan's 2014 bilingual Vaayai Moodi Pesavum (Tamil)/Samsaaram Aarogyathinu Haanikaram (Malayalam). In 2016, he played the character of Mukundan in Nelson Venkatesan's critically acclaimed Oru Naal Koothu (2016).

His first role as a central character was in the Tamil crime thriller Vellai Pookal (2019). He played the role of Ajay, a software engineer working in Microsoft and son of retired cop Rudhran (played by Vivek). The film was shot entirely in Seattle and released in April 2019 to highly positive reviews from critiques and audiences alike. His performance was well received with India Glitz terming it “perfect as the typical Indian techie" and The New Indian Express calling his performance "relatable and realistic".

He also produces content and commercials (web series, television commercials, digital brand films) under his production company Madboys Creatives. He produced and acted in South India's first web series, Happy to be Single, distributed by Sony Music India with Anirudh Ravichander launching it.

Filmography 
All films/web series are in Tamil, unless otherwise noted.

Web series

Movies

References

External links 
 
Dev on Times of India
Galatta Tamil interview – Rejected offer from Big Boss 1 Tamil

Male actors in Tamil cinema
Living people
21st-century Indian male actors
Tamil male actors
Indian male film actors
Year of birth missing (living people)